David Vrbata (born July 23, 1983) is a Czech professional ice hockey player, currently playing for Italian team HC Egna of the Alps Hockey League. He played with BK Mladá Boleslav and HC Sparta Praha in the Czech Extraliga, and with HK Poprad and HKm Zvolen in the Slovak Extraliga.

His brother is the National Hockey League player Radim Vrbata.

External links

References

1983 births
Living people
BK Mladá Boleslav players
HK Poprad players
Czech ice hockey forwards
Calgary Hitmen players
Sportspeople from Mladá Boleslav
Czech expatriate ice hockey players in Canada
Czech expatriate ice hockey players in Slovakia
Czech expatriate ice hockey players in Germany
Czech expatriate sportspeople in Italy
Expatriate ice hockey players in Italy